Apocalyptic literature is a genre of prophetical writing that developed in post-Exilic Jewish culture and was popular among millennialist early Christians. Apocalypse is a Greek word meaning "revelation", "an unveiling or unfolding of things not previously known and which could not be known apart from the unveiling".

As a genre, apocalyptic literature details the authors' visions of the end times/end of the age as revealed by an angel or other heavenly messenger. The apocalyptic literature of Judaism and Christianity embraces a considerable period, from the centuries following the Babylonian exile down to the close of the Middle Ages.

Origins
Apocalyptic elements can be detected in the prophetic books of Joel and Zechariah, while Isaiah chapters 24–27 and 33 present well-developed apocalypses. The second half of the Book of Daniel (chs. 7-12) offers a fully matured and classic example of this genre of literature.

Unfulfilled prophecy

The non-fulfillment of prophecies served to popularize the methods of apocalyptic in comparison with the non-fulfillment of the advent of the Messianic kingdom. Thus, though Jeremiah had promised that after seventy years Israelites should be restored to their own land, and then enjoy the blessings of the Messianic kingdom under the Messianic king, this period passed by and things remained as of old. Some believe that the Messianic kingdom was not necessarily predicted to occur at the end of the seventy years of the Babylonian exile, but at some unspecified time in the future. The only thing for certain that was predicted was the return of the Jews to their land, which occurred when Cyrus the Persian conquered Babylon in circa 539 BC. Thus, the fulfillment of the Messianic kingdom remained in the future for the Jews.

Haggai and Zechariah explained the delay by the failure of Judah to rebuild the temple, and so hope of the kingdom persisted, until in the first half of the 2nd century the delay is explained in the Books of Daniel and Enoch as due not to man's shortcomings but to the counsels of God. Regarding the 70 years of exile predicted in Jeremiah 29:10, the Jews were first exiled in 605 BC in the reign of king Jehoiakim and were allowed to return to their land in c. 536 BC when King Cyrus conquered Babylon. This period was approximately 70 years, as prophesied by Jeremiah. Others connect the 70 years of Jeremiah with the 70 weeks of years mentioned by the angel in Daniel 9. Enoch 85 interprets the 70 years of Jeremiah as the 70 successive reigns of the 70 angelic patrons of the nations, which are to come to a close in his own generation. The Book of Enoch, however, was not considered inspired Scripture by the Jews, so that any failed prophecy in it is of no consequence to the Jewish faith.

The Greek empire of the East was overthrown by Rome, and prompted a new interpretation of Daniel. The fourth and last empire was declared to be Roman by the Apocalypse of Baruch chapters 36–40 and 4 Ezra 10:60–12:35. Again, these two books were not considered inspired Scripture by the Jews, and thus were not authoritative on matters of prophecy. In addition, earlier in Daniel chapter 7 and also in chapter 2, the fourth world empire is considered to be Rome since Babylon, Medo-Persia (Achaemenid Empire), Greece, and Rome were world empires which all clearly arrived in succession.

Such ideas as those of "the day of Yahweh" and the "new heavens and a new earth" were re-interpreted by the Jewish people with fresh nuances in conformity with their new settings. Thus the inner development of Jewish apocalyptic was conditioned by the historical experiences of the nation.

Traditions
Another source of apocalyptic thought was primitive mythological and cosmological traditions, in which the eye of the seer could see the secrets of the future. Thus the six days of the world's creation, followed by a seventh of rest, were regarded as at once a history of the past and a forecasting of the future. As the world was made in six days its history would be accomplished in six thousand years, since each day with God was as a thousand years and a thousand years as one day; and as the six days of creation were followed by one of rest, so the six thousand years of the world's history would be followed by a rest of a thousand years.

Object and contents

The object of this literature in general was to reconcile the righteousness of God with the suffering condition of His righteous servants on earth.  Early Old Testament prophecy taught the need of personal and national righteousness, and foretold the ultimate blessedness of the righteous nation on the present earth. Its views were not systematic and comprehensive in regard to the nations in general. Regarding the individual, it held that God's service here was its own and adequate reward, and saw no need of postulating another world to set right the evils of this one.

But later, with the growing claims of the individual and the acknowledgment of these in the religious and intellectual life, both problems, and especially the latter, pressed themselves irresistibly on the notice of religious thinkers, and made it impossible for any conception of the divine rule and righteousness to gain acceptance, which did not render adequate satisfaction to the claims of both problems. To render such satisfaction was the task undertaken by apocalyptic, as well as to vindicate the righteousness of God alike in respect of the individual and of the nation. Later prophecy incorporated an idea of future vindication of present evils, often including the idea of an afterlife.

Apocalyptic prophets sketched in outline the history of the world and mankind, the origin of evil and its course, and the final consummation of all things. The righteous as a nation should yet possess the earth, either via an eternal Messianic kingdom on earth, or else in temporary blessedness here and eternal blessedness hereafter. Though the individual might perish amid the disorders of this world, apocalyptic prophets taught that the righteous person would not fail to attain through resurrection the recompense that was due in the Messianic kingdom or, alternatively, in heaven itself.

Comparison to prophecy

Message
Some may distinguish between the messages of the prophets and the messages of proto-apocalyptic and apocalyptic literature by saying that the message of the prophets was primarily a preaching of repentance and righteousness needed for the nation to escape judgment; the message of the apocalyptic writers was of patience and trust for that deliverance and reward were sure to come. Neither the prophets nor the apocalyptic authors are without conflict between their messages, however, and there are significant similarities between prophecy and apocalyptic writings.

Apocalyptic literature shares with prophecy revelation through the use of visions and dreams, and these often combine reality and fantasy. In both cases, a heavenly interpreter is often provided to the receiver so that he may understand the many complexities of what he has seen. The oracles in Amos, Hosea, First Isaiah, and Jeremiah give a clear sense of how messages of imminent punishment develop into the later proto-apocalyptic literature, and eventually into the thoroughly apocalyptic literature of Daniel 7–12. The fully apocalyptic visions in Daniel 7–12, as well as those in the New Testament's Revelation, can trace their roots to the pre-exilic latter biblical prophets; the sixth century BCE prophets Ezekiel, Isaiah 40–55 and 56–66, Haggai 2, and Zechariah 1–8 show a transition phase between prophecy and apocalyptic literature.

Dualistic theology
Prophecy believes that this world is God's world and that in this world His goodness and truth will yet be vindicated. Hence the prophet prophesies of a definite future arising out of and organically connected with the present. The apocalyptic writer despairs of the present and directs his hopes to the future, to a new world standing in essential opposition to the present. This becomes a dualistic principle, which, though it can largely be accounted for by the interaction of certain inner tendencies and outward sorrowful experience on the part of Judaism, may ultimately be derived from Mazdean influences. This principle, which shows itself in the conception that the various nations are under angelic rulers, who are in a greater or less degree in rebellion against God, as in Daniel and Enoch, grows in strength with each succeeding age, till at last Satan is conceived as "the ruler of this world" or "the god of this age."

Conception of history
Apocalyptic writing took a wider view of the world's history than did prophecy. Whereas prophecy had to deal with governments of other nations, apocalyptic writings arose at a time when Israel had been subject for generations to the sway of one or other of the great world-powers. Hence to harmonize Israel's difficulties with belief in God's righteousness, apocalyptic writing had to encompass such events in the counsels of God, the rise, duration and the downfall of each empire in turn, until, finally the lordship of the world passed into the hands of Israel, or the final judgment arrived. These events belonged in the main to the past, but the writer represented them as still in the future, arranged under certain artificial categories of time definitely determined from the beginning in the counsels of God and revealed by Him to His servants, the prophets. Determinism thus became a leading characteristic of Jewish apocalyptic, and its conception of history became mechanical.

Hebrew Bible

Characteristics
The revelations from heavenly messengers about the end times came in the form of angels or from people who were taken up to heaven and returned to earth with messages. The descriptions not only tell of the end times, but also describe both past and present events and their significance, often in heavily coded language. When speaking of the end times, apocalyptic literature generally includes chronologies of events that are to occur, and frequently places them in the near future, which gives a sense of urgency to the prophet's broader message. Though the understanding of the present is bleak, the visions of the future are far more positive, and include divinely delivered victory and a complete reformation of absolutely everything. Many visions of these end times mirror creation mythologies, invoke the triumph of God over the primordial forces of chaos, and provide clear distinctions between light and dark, good and evil. In such revelations, humankind is typically divided into a small group that experiences salvation, while the wicked majority is destroyed. Since the apocalyptic genre developed during the Persian period, this dualism may have developed under the influence of Persian thought. The imagery in apocalyptic literature is not realistic or reflective of the physical world as it was, but is rather surreal and fantastic, invoking a sense of wonder at the complete newness of the new order to come.

Canonical

Proto-apocalyptic
 Isaiah 24–27; 33; 34–35 
 Jeremiah 33:14–26
 Ezekiel  38–39
 Joel 3:9–17
 Zechariah 12–14

Apocalyptic
 Daniel 7–12

Some are possibly falsely attributed works (pseudepigraphic) except for the passages from Ezekiel and Joel. Of the remaining passages and books, some consider large sections of Daniel attributable to the Maccabean period, with the rest possibly to the same period. Some consider Isaiah 33 to be written about 163 BCE; Zechariah 12–14 about 160 BCE; Isaiah 24–27 about 128 BCE; and Isaiah 34–35 sometime in the reign of John Hyrcanus. Jeremiah 33:14–26 is assigned by Marti to Maccabean times, but this is disputed.

Non-canonical
 3 Enoch
 Apocalypse of Abraham
 Apocalypse of Adam
 Apocalypse of Moses
 Apocalypse of Sedrach
 Apocalypse of Zephaniah
 Apocalypse of Zerubbabel
 Aramaic Apocalypse
 Gabriel's Revelation
 Genesis Apocryphon
 Greek Apocalypse of Baruch
 Greek Apocalypse of Daniel
 Greek Apocalypse of Ezra
 Sefer Elijah
 Syriac Apocalypse of Baruch

New Testament
In the transition from Jewish literature to that of early Christianity, there is a continuation of the tradition of apocalyptic prophecy. Christianity preserved the Jewish apocalyptic tradition (as Judaism developed into Rabbinism) and gave it a Christian character by a systematic process of interpolation. Christianity cultivated this form of literature and made it the vehicle of its own ideas. Christianity saw itself as the spiritual representative of what was true in prophecy and apocalyptic.

Canonical
Matthew 24
The Sheep and the Goats
Mark 13
2 Thessalonians 2
1 Timothy 4
2 Peter 3
Jude 14-15
Book of Revelation

Non-canonical
 Apocalypse of Golias
 Apocalypse of Paul
 Apocalypse of Peter
 Apocalypse of Pseudo-Methodius
 Apocalypse of Samuel of Kalamoun
 Apocalypse of Stephen
 Apocalypse of Thomas
 Coptic Apocalypse of Elijah

Gnostic

 Gnostic Apocalypse of Peter
 First Apocalypse of James
 Second Apocalypse of James
 Coptic Apocalypse of Paul

See also
 Apocalypse Series
 Apocalyptic and post-apocalyptic fiction
 Apocalypticism
 Christian eschatology
 Hindu eschatology
 Islamic eschatology
 Jewish eschatology
 List of dates predicted for apocalyptic events
 Messianic Age
 Millennialism
 Ragnarök

Notes

The reference to Jeremiah 29:5-6 should read Jeremiah 29:10

References
 
 Charlesworth, James H. ed., The Old Testament Pseudepigrapha, Vol. 1: Apocalyptic Literature and Testaments, Gsrden City, New York: Doubleday & Co., 1983.
 Collins, John Joseph The Apocalyptic Imagination: An Introduction to Jewish Apocalyptic Literature,  (The Biblical Resource Series), Grand Rapids: Eerdman, 1998 (second edition).
 Coogan, Michael A Brief Introduction to the Old Testament, Oxford: Oxford University Press 2009.
 Cook, David, Contemporary Muslim Apocalyptic Literature (Religion and Politics), Syracure, NY: Syracuse University Press, 2005. 
 Cook, Stephen L., The Apocalyptic Literature: Interpreting Biblical Texts, Nashville: Abingdon Press, 2003.
 Frye, Northrop, 1957. Anatomy of Criticism: Four Essays, Princeton, Princeton University Press, 1957.
 Goswiller, Richard, Revelation, Pacific Study Series, Melbourne, 1987.
 Reddish, Mitchell G. Apocalyptic Literature: A Reader, Peabody, Massachusetts: Hendrickson Publishers, 1998.

External links
  (Thorough historical introduction).
 (A coincise introduction to the Apocalypse of John)
 
  (sourced in 

 
Apocrypha
Christian literary genres
Literary genres
 
Religious literature